OGP Gaz-System S.A. is a designated natural gas transmission system operator in Poland.

The company was established on 16 April 2004 as a wholly owned subsidiary of PGNiG (Polish Petroleum and Gas Mining Co.) under the name PGNiG – Przesył Sp. z o.o.  On 28 April 2005, all shares of the company were transferred to the State Treasury of Poland and the current name of the company was adopted on 8 June 2005.

Gaz-System owns and operates all gas transmission pipelines in Poland, except the Yamal–Europe pipeline owned by EuRoPol Gaz S.A.  The company also responsible for construction of the terminal LNG at Świnoujście and the Baltic Pipe pipeline between Poland and Denmark.

References

External links
 Official website

Energy in Poland
Natural gas pipeline companies
Oil and gas companies of Poland
Polish brands